The Soren Hanson House, a Queen Anne-style house at 166 W. Main St. in Hyrum, Utah, was built in 1905–07.  It was listed on the National Register of Historic Places in 1982.

It is a two-and-a-half-story "castle" which was, until 1980 at least, the largest private residence in the city of Hyrum.  It was the home of Hyrum-born Soren Hanson, a businessman and mayor of Hyrum in the early Twentieth century, who at one time was "the largest dealer in eggs in the Intermountain West."

References

National Register of Historic Places in Cache County, Utah
Queen Anne architecture in Utah
Houses completed in 1907